O Saci is a 1953 Brazilian children-family fantasy film, directed by Rodolfo Nanni, written by Nanni with a story by Arthur Neves, and based on the novel of same name written by Monteiro Lobato. Noted for being the first family film to be ever made in Brazil, it is also the first theatrical Sítio do Picapau Amarelo adaptation. Introducing young actress Olga Maria as Emília and Paulo Matozinho as the title character Saci, it adapts the novel in which Pedrinho (Lívio Nanni) demonstrates interest in capturing the supernatural, one-legged mulatto boy figure, the Saci, inhabiting the nearby virgin forest. Curiously, in 1954 the film won the Saci Award, that rewarded the best films of the decade.

Plot
At the peaceful Sítio do Picapau Amarelo (Yellow Woodpecker Ranch), two kids, Pedrinho and Lúcia, and Lúcia's talkative and rough doll Emília, attempt to capture the Saci, advised by the wise Uncle Barnabé. After Lúcia is cursed by the demonic, reptilian witch Cuca, the brave and bold Pedrinho starts a journey through the forest with the Saci, in order to make the evil hag bring the girl back.

Cast
Paulo Matozinho as the Saci - While Monteiro Lobato describes the Saci as a tiny, black gnome or elf in the novel, the film uses the one-legged boy version of the myth.
Lívio Nanni as Pedrinho
Aristéia Paula de Souza as Lúcia
Olga Maria as Emília
Maria Rosa Ribeiro as Mrs. Benta
Otávio Araújo as Uncle Barnabé
Benedita Rodrigues as Aunt Nastácia
M. Meneguelli as Cuca - The old hag version of the myth replaces the reptilian, demonic aspect look of Cuca, featured in the novel and in every ensuing version of the story.
Iara von Tressler as Yara (as Yara Trexler)
Meninos de Ribeirão Bonito as the Sacis

Production and reception
Rodolfo Nanni wrote, produced and directed the film (the very first of the children-family genre in Brazil) at the age of 28, after returning from a cinema-studying season in Paris. His niece Lívio Nanni portrays Pedrinho, following some casting auditions. Extras credited as "Meninos de Ribeirão Bonito" ("Boys from Ribeirão Bonito") portray Saci's younger brothers. Released only four years after the death of author Monteiro Lobato, on 10 September 1953, O Saci was a commercial success and helped to make Lobato's work popular for both children and adults, and especially among illiterate people. The film is still well remembered and had a second premiere at its 60th anniversary, at the Amazonas Film Festival.

References

External links
 
 https://web.archive.org/web/20101106014318/http://www.oretorno.com.br/galerias_nanni_folder/o_saci/index.htm - Gallery with cast reunion and stills of the movie.

1950s children's fantasy films
1953 films
Brazilian children's films
Films based on Brazilian novels
1950s Portuguese-language films
Sítio do Picapau Amarelo
Brazilian black-and-white films
Brazilian fantasy adventure films